The Yuexiushan Stadium is a multi-purpose stadium in Guangzhou, Guangdong, China, named for its location at the foot of Yuexiu Hill. It is currently mostly used for football matches and also sometimes for athletics. It is located on 4 Yingyuan Road. The stadium is owned by the Guangzhou Sports Bureau.

The original stadium at the same location opened before 1926. In 1950, it was completely rebuild with a capacity for 35,000 people. However, following renovation and the installation of fixed seating in 2012, the capacity is now 18,000.

The stadium is best reached by taking Guangzhou Metro Line 2 to Sun Yat-Sen Memorial Hall Station.

History 

In the Qing dynasty, it was originally the location of the ammunition depot. When the Republic era came, Chen Jiongming planned to turn the area into a sports venue. The playground opened before 1926, and had muddy ground and few facilities.

In 1950 the new government refresh the playground as both a sports stadium and arena for civic celebrations. As the home stadium of first the Guangzhou city side and later the Guangdong provincial side, Yuexiushan hosted a large number of friendly matches with international opposition in the late 1950s and early 1960s including against Algeria, Sweden and Soviet champions Spartak Moscow. These games would come to be known as 'foreign battles' and would see both Cuba and Albania play at Yuexiushan in the early 1970s and, after the end of Cultural Revolution, visiting sides included the West German Olympic Team.

Yuexiushan was also the venue for Guangzhou's National Day celebrations, although an event to mark the 40th anniversary of the Russian October Revolution ended in disaster when 33 people were killed in a crush.

The Yuexiushan Stadium hosted the inaugural Guangdong-Hong Kong Cup match in early 1979, which Guangdong won 1-0.

By the late 1980s Yuexiushan was no longer the premier ground in Guangzhou with the opening of the new Tianhe stadium. However, Guangzhou continued to play their regular fixtures at Yuexiushan and finished second in the National Championship in 1992 and 1994, helped by an unbeaten record of 21 games at Yuexiushan.

Yuexiushan has undergone multiple renovations since the late 1990s which have seen player facilities in the entrance tower at the city end of the ground improved and a roof, electronic scoreboard and fixed plastic seating installed for spectators. Fans sitting at the Yuexiu Park end of the ground are still exposed to the elements though.

Following their promotion to the Chinese Super League (CSL), original tenants Guangzhou Evergrande (the successors to the Guangzhou side founded in 1954 and the first Chinese sports club with 5 million followers on Weibo) moved out of the Yuexiushan Stadium and across town to Tianhe Stadium for the 2011 season. Guangzhou R&F played their first home game at Yuexiushan in the summer of 2011 and were promoted to the CSL at the end of the season. Following R&F's third-place finish in 2014, Yuexiushan hosted four Asian Champions League games under floodlights in 2015.

Yuexiushan was renovated over the winter of 2016–17. The pitch was relayed, VIP facilities improved and the whole stadium painted blue (the colour of tenants Guangzhou R&F). The first match at the refurbished stadium was held on 28 April 2017 when R&F were defeated 3–1 by Guizhou Hengfeng in the CSL. Yuexiushan was later repainted in gold and green after Guangzhou R&F suffered a poor run of form. The decision was reportedly made on Feng Shui principles.

Notable events
October 1976: Guangdong 0–2 Australia. Australia were the first international side to tour China after Mao Zedong's death.
May 1978: Yuexiushan hosts Guangdong vs. West Bromwich Albion friendly match.
25 December 2010: Super Show 3 Tour – The South Korean K-pop group Super Junior held a concert to a sold-out crowd of 30,000 people at the stadium.
17 March 2012: Yuexiushan hosts the first Canton Derby as Guangzhou R&F beat reigning league champions and former Yuexiushan tenants Guangzhou Evergrande, 2–0.
Spring 2015: Yuexiushan hosts AFC Champions League football as Guangzhou R&F play in the group stages. R&F came through two qualifying rounds after finishing third in the Chinese Super League in 2014.

See also
 Sports in China
 Yuexiu Hill

References

Sports venues in Guangzhou
Football venues in Guangzhou
Yuexiu District
Multi-purpose stadiums in China
Guangzhou F.C.
Guangzhou City F.C.
Venues of the 2010 Asian Games
Asian Games football venues
Sports venues completed in 1950
1950 establishments in China